Ülemiste is a subdistrict in the district of Lasnamäe, Tallinn, the capital of Estonia. It has a population of 1,444.

Estonia's largest airport Lennart Meri Tallinn Airport is located in Ülemiste.

Ülemiste is the location of the Ülemiste Keskus shopping mall and the Ülemiste City business park.

Ülemiste railway station will be the location of Rail Baltica's Tallinn terminal, which is planned to open in 2030.

Gallery

See also

Ülemiste City
Ülemiste Tunnel

References 

Subdistricts of Tallinn